Lina El Tannir, (born October 23, 1987 in Cairo) was a professional squash player who represented Egypt. 

El Tannir started playing squash when she was twelve years old because her cousin, Heba Abu Ouf - former National Champion - and brother, Mohamed El Tannir, already did. Based at the Cairo’s Gezira Club she was coached by Talha Hussein, Mohamed Ismail and Akram Youssef. 

As a junior El Tannir won many national events and several international tournaments. These included the German Junior Open twice (2002 & 2005), the British Junior Open (2006), and was runner up in the Dutch Junior Open in 2002. She also represented Egypt in the World Junior Team Championship in 2005.

El Tannir was ranked third in the national swimming national team when she was twelve and second in the national gymnastics team when she was eight. El Tannir reached a career-high world professionals ranking of World No. 80 in October 2006.

References

External links 

Egyptian female squash players
Living people
1987 births
21st-century Egyptian women